The Best American Short Stories 1987, a volume in The Best American Short Stories series, was edited by guest editor Ann Beattie with Shannon Ravenel.

Short stories included

References

External links
 Best American Short Stories

1987 anthologies
Fiction anthologies
Short Stories 1987
Houghton Mifflin books